Fourche a Du Clos is a stream in Ste. Genevieve County in the U.S. state of Missouri. It is a tributary of Establishment Creek.

Fourche a Du Clos has the name of Du Clos, a pioneer citizen (Fourche means "fork" in French).

See also
List of rivers of Missouri

References

Rivers of Ste. Genevieve County, Missouri